Arlequin Mahomet is a one act farce by Alain-René Lesage.  It was first performed at the Foire de Saint Laurent in 1714.  Arlequin Mahomet was performed as the second play in a series consisting of La Foire de Guibray and Le Tombeau de Nostradamus.  Between the three works, Lesage created a comedy in three acts.

Plot summary
Arlequin is being pursued by his debtors, so his friend Boubekir gives him a flying box so that he can flee the country.  As he is flying over Persia, he sees a young man about to kill himself because his true love, the Princess of Basra, is to be married to the Kam of the Tartars (played by Pierrot from La Foire de Guibray).  Arlequin agrees to help.

He flies to the princess who does not want to marry the Kam and is praying to Mohammed.  When she sees Arlequin in his flying machine, she believes that he is Mohammed.  Arlequin tells her that she does not have to marry the Kam and presents her with a portrait of her future husband, the Prince of Persia.  The Princess tells her father about this revelation, and the King and the Kam go in search of the "false Arlequin."  Meanwhile, Arlequin enters the scene and flies over their heads.  Arlequin beats them with his stick until the King and the Kam agree that the princess should marry the Prince.  Arlequin brings the Prince to the court in his flying machine, so he can marry the princess.  Arlequin, in turn, marries the princess' servant.

Characters
Arlequin, a false Mohammed
Dahi, a merchant, the neighbor of Arlequin
Boubekir, traveler and mathematician
The King of Baraasa
The Princess, his daughter
The Kam of the Tartars
The Prince of Persia
A servant

External links
Arlequin Mahomet on Gallica

1714 plays
Plays by Alain-René Lesage